Tat Mok National Park is a national park in Phetchabun Province, Thailand. Established on 30 October 1998, it is the 87th national park in Thailand. Both park and the waterfall are named after Tat Mok Mountains.

Geography
The park's area covers 181,250 rai ~ .
The national park is abutting Phu Pha Daeng Wildlife Sanctuary and connected by Nam Nao National Park to the north, abutting Phu Khiao Wildlife Sanctuary to the east and abutting Tabo-Huai Yai Wildlife Sanctuary to the south. The park's streams and waterfalls provide the main source for the Pa Sak and Chi Rivers.

History
In mid-1991 a survey was set up, a beautiful waterfall was found suitable for renovation into a tourist attraction. Later in 1995, the Royal Forest Department requested additional information so that the Tabo forest and Huai Yai forest area could become a national park. Tat Mok was declared the 87th National Park on 30 October 1998. Since 2002 this national park has been managed by Protected Areas Regional Office 11 (Phitsanulok)

Flora
The park features forest types, including mixed deciduous, deciduous dipterocarp, dry evergreen and hill evergreen forest. 
Plants include:

Fauna
In the park are the following mammals:

The park has approximately 170 species of birds, of which some 110 species of passerine from 33 families, represented by one species:

and some 60 species of non-passerine from 19 families, represented by one species:

And reptiles:

Places
 Namtok Song Nang - a 12-tiered waterfall.

Location

See also
 List of national parks in Thailand
 List of Protected Areas Regional Offices of Thailand

References

National parks of Thailand
Geography of Phetchabun province
Tourist attractions in Phetchabun province
1998 establishments in Thailand
Protected areas established in 1998